is a passenger railway station in located in the town of Shirahama,  Nishimuro District, Wakayama Prefecture, Japan, operated by West Japan Railway Company (JR West).

Lines

Station layout
The station consists of two opposed side platforms connected to the station building by a level crossing. The station is unattended.

Platforms

Adjacent stations

|-
!colspan=5|West Japan Railway Company (JR West)

History
Kii-Hiki Station opened on October 30, 1936. With the privatization of the Japan National Railways (JNR) on April 1, 1987, the station came under the aegis of the West Japan Railway Company.

Passenger statistics
In fiscal 2019, the station was used by an average of 72 passengers daily (boarding passengers only).

Surrounding Area
Hiki River
Shirahama Municipal Atagi Elementary School
Shirahama Town Hall Hiokigawa Office (formerly Hiokigawa Town Hall)

See also
List of railway stations in Japan

References

External links

 Kii-Hiki Station (West Japan Railway) 

Railway stations in Wakayama Prefecture
Railway stations in Japan opened in 1936
Shirahama, Wakayama